Abbey Gate is a hamlet in the borough of Maidstone in Kent, England.

Hamlets in Kent